Ein Gedi is an oasis in Israel.

Ein Gedi may also refer to:
Ein Gedi (kibbutz)
Ein Gedi Mineral Water
Ein Gedi race
Ein Gedi Spa